Folkan (also known as Folkteatern, English: People's Theater) was a theatre at Östermalmstorg in Stockholm, Sweden. It was built in 1856 and demolished in 2008 because of problems with the foundation. The theatre was called Ladugårdslandsteatern when it was built, but was renamed to Bijou-teatern in 1877. It got the name Folkan in 1887.

References

Former theatres in Stockholm
Buildings and structures in Stockholm
1856 establishments in Sweden
2008 disestablishments in Sweden
Demolished buildings and structures in Sweden
Buildings and structures demolished in 2008